Prps is a New York-based luxury fresh denim brand that was established in 2002 by former Nike designer, Donwan Harrell. The brand motto is "Bruised, never broken".

There are three Prps brands:
Prps Noir - Prices range from $650-$1500
Prps - Prices range from $425-$695
Prps Goods & Co. - Prices range from $185-$475. All tops are under the Goods & Co brand

Prps jeans are manufactured in Japan. The denim used for the manufacture of the jeans is Japanese and Zimbabwean cotton. The Japanese manufacturer of the jeans uses looms from the 1960s similar to the type that were used to produce denim for Levi's. PRPS goods were originally all made in Japan. Due to increased demand PRPS Goods and co. was created to offer Prps designs to a larger audience. Many Prps goods still use quality materials and authentic distressing yet are produced in China. Prps leather jackets are made in Italy.

Harrell says that the manufacturing process was inspired by denim worn by workers before it became popular as an everyday fashion. The designer launched a women's range in the US in September 2008 and will be launching in Europe and Asia in January 2009.

Some of the distinguishing features of Prps jeans include a folded back pocket, the purple tab on the back pocket, different colored buttons on the fly, and purple line selvage.

References

External links
 Official Prps website

Clothing brands of the United States
Jeans by brand